Black and White is the first EP by Italian melodic metal band Dimmi Argus. It was released on 6 April 2010 and produced by Dimitar Argirov.

Track listing

 My Way Home (Demo Version) 4:43
(Music written by Dimitar Argirov & Dragomir Draganov, Lyrics written by Dimitar Argirov)
 Black And White (Long Version) 6:35
(Music & Lyrics written by Dimitar Argirov)
 HO HE TAKABA (Bulgarian Version) 4:59
(Music & Lyrics written by Dimitar Argirov)
 HO HE TAKABA (Instrumental Mix) 4:59
(Music written by Dimitar Argirov)

Personnel
 Dimmi Argus – Vocals, Producer
 Dragomir Draganov – Guitars, Keyboards, Mixing & Mastering

References
 DIMMI ARGUS - Black and White (EP) (review) | Metal Katehizis (in Bulgarian)
  Dimmi Argus - Hard rock dall Est'Europeo

External links
 Dimmi Argus's Official Site
 Double D Music's Official Site

2010 EPs
Dimmi Argus albums